David Walsh is an American psychologist, educator, and author specializing in parenting, family life and the impact of media on children and teens.

Walsh was the president and founder of the National Institute on Media and the Family based in Minneapolis until it closed its doors in 2009.  All of the programs and products of the National Institute on Media and the Family have been transferred to the Search Institute.

Walsh has written ten books including the best seller Why Do They Act That Way? A Survival Guide to the Adolescent Brain for You and Your Teen and No, Why Kids - of All Ages - Need to Hear It and Ways Parents Can Say It. In 2010, he and his wife, Monica, and daughter, Erin, launched Mind Positive Parenting, which translates brain science into resources for parents and professionals.

Walsh received his Ph.D. in psychology from the University of Minnesota where he is currently on the faculty.  David is also a consultant to the World Health Organization. He has been the recipient of many awards including the 1999 "Friend of the Family Award" presented by the Minnesota Council on Family Relations.

Walsh is a public speaker and does presentations focused on brain development, adolescence, the impact of media on children and the factors that influence school performance, literacy and violence prevention.

Walsh has appeared on such television programs as 60 Minutes, Dateline NBC, The Early Show, NewsHour with Jim Lehrer, Good Morning America, The Today Show, the Jane Pauley Show and National Public Radio's All Things Considered. His work has been covered in major outlets such as The New York Times, The Wall Street Journal, The Washington Post, Los Angeles Times, Time, Reader's Digest, and others. He has been featured in three nationally broadcast specials on PBS. He appeared in Spencer Halpin's Moral Kombat, a documentary on violence in video games.

Notable works 

 Smart Parenting, Smarter Kids: The One Brain Book You Need to Help Your Child Grow Brighter, Healthier, and Happier (2012)
 No, Why Kids - of All Ages - Need to Hear It and Ways Parents Can Say It (2007)
 Why Do They Act That Way? A Survival Guide to the Adolescent Brain for You and Your Teen (2004)

References

External links
 
 David Walsh, Ph.D.
Interview with David Walsh, Ph.D. about his book Selling Out America's Children, All About Kids! TV Series #185 (1994)

Living people
University of Minnesota College of Liberal Arts alumni
Place of birth missing (living people)
Year of birth missing (living people)
21st-century American psychologists
American male writers